Hanna Jubran is a Palestinian Arab Israeli sculptor, born in Jish, the upper Galilee. His work addresses the concepts of time, movement, balance and space. Each sculpture occupies and creates its own reality influenced by its immediate surroundings. The work does not rely on one media to evoke the intended response, but takes advantage of compatible materials such as, wood, granite, steel, iron and bronze.

He received his M.F.A. in 1983 in sculpture from the University of Wisconsin–Milwaukee and is currently a Sculpture Professor and Sculpture Area Coordinator at East Carolina University in Greenville, North Carolina.

International art shows, competitions and symposia 

The International Sculpture Symposium in Granby, Quebec, Canada, The Ecatepec, Mexico International Monumental Sculpture Symposium, The Toyamura International Sculpture Biennial at Toyamura Village, Japan, The International Sculpture Symposium and Conference at Europos Parkas in Vilnius, Lithuania, The Second International Invitational Iron Sculpture Exhibition and Iron Pour at Tallinn University in Tallinn, Estonia, and The International Woodcarving Symposium in Kemivarji, Finland. A recent commission Hanna just completed can be found on the grounds of Fayetteville State University, in Fayetteville, North Carolina.  It is a nine-segmented concrete sculpture and reaches 11’ in height. Hanna is consistent, in his pursuit of creating enjoyable sculptures for private and corporate collections.

Research awards 
2003- University of Wisconsin – Milwaukee Distinguished Alumnus Award, Milwaukee, Wisconsin
2002–Artist Fellowship Award at The Southeastern College Art Conference, Mobile, Alabama
2002–The ECU Five-Year Achievement Award, Greenville, North Carolina
2001- VCAA Teacher Scholar Award, East Carolina University, Greenville, North Carolina
2001-Outstanding Artistic Achievement Award at The Southeastern College Art Conference, Columbia, South Carolina
2000- The Board of Governors Teaching Award
2000-01- East Carolina University Alumni Distinguished Professor for Teaching Award Finalist, East Carolina University, Greenville, North Carolina

Professional memberships 
1999–2007 Who’s who in American Art
1998 –2007 Member of SECAC – Southern College Art Conference
1998–2003 Member and Director of the International Association for Monumental Sculpture Events. Granby Canada
1997–2007 Member of Phi-Beta Delta Gamma Rho Chapter
1997–2007 Member the International Sculpture Center, New York
1994 –2007 Member of Tri-State Sculptors Educational Association
1982–2007 Member of College Art Association, New York.

Exhibition awards 
2007 – Purchase Award, JUST- Jackson Union Sculpture Tour, Jackson, Tennessee
2004 – Artist choice and 3rd Place Chaco Argentina Sculpture Biennal, Chaco, Argentina
2004 – 1st. Place 3D, Sculpture Salmagundi VIII Indoor Exhibition, Rocky Mount, North Carolina
2004 – Best in Show, The down East Sculpture Exhibition, Greenville, North Carolina
2003 – Purchase Award, Yuzi Paradise Sculpture Competition, China
2003 – Semi-Grand Prize in the Toyamura International Sculpture Biennale, Hokkaido, Japan
2001- Merit Award – 29th Annual Competition North Carolina Artists, Fayetteville, North Carolina
2000 – Best Execution of Concept, Ma'llot International Sculpture Symposium 2000, Ma'llot, Israel
2000 – Best of Show, Salmagundi Outdoor Sculpture Show, Rocky Mount, North Carolina

Selected commissions and collections 
2007 – JUST- Jackson Union Sculpture Tour, 18’ steel and paint sculpture, Jackson, Tennessee
2005 – First Flight Rotary & Icarus International Time Capsule, Kitty Hawk, North Carolina
2003 – Monument to a Century of Flight (14, 10’-20’ stainless steel pylons) Kitty Hawk, North Carolina
2002 – Presbyterian College Scotsman (12’ bronze casting) – Clinton, South Carolina
2002 – Stone&Iron sculpture for Griffis Sculpture Park, East Otto, New York
2001 – William E. Laupus Health Sciences Library (54" bronze casting) Greenville, North Carolina
2001 – Kinston Art Center – Community Artistic Bench (8'X8' welded Steel & Concrete)
2001 – Davidson College Wildcat (11' bronze casting) – Davidson, North Carolina
2001 – Steel Sculpture for Burlington College, Burlington, New Jersey
2000 – Jesse Helms Archive Center – Bald Eagle (22' wingspan cast bronze) Wingate, North Carolina
2000 – Bronze Sculpture, East Carolina University Chancellor's office, Greenville, North Carolina
1999 – Bronze Sculpture, Town of Nags Head Municipal Building, Nags Head, North Carolina
1999 – Soapstone and Bronze Sculpture, Wright State University, Dayton, Ohio
1999 – Steel Sculpture, Washburn University, Topeka, Kansas
1999 – Alabaster sculpture, Greenville Museum of Art, Greenville, North Carolina
1998 – Ecatepec International Monumental Sculpture Symposium, Ecatepec, Mexico
1998 – Large Outdoor Steel Sculpture, Association d’Eve’nements Internationauxde Sculpture
Monumentale, Granby, Quebec, Canada
1997 – Large outdoor concrete sculpture, Fayetteville University, Fayetteville, North Carolina

Monumental collections and symposia 
2006 – Ventspils Granite Boulder Sculpture Symposium, Ventspils, Latvia
2006 – Chaco, Argentina Sculpture Biennal, Chaco, Argentina
2005 – 9th Internationales Holzbildhauer Symposium, St. Blasien, Germany
2004 – Pedvale Sculpture Park “Prime Elements of the World” Sabile, Latvia
2004 – Tijuana – San Diego Park – Permanent Collection Gani Sculpture Garden, San Diego, California
2004 – Chaco, Argentina Sculpture Biennal, Chaco, Argentina
2003 – Pirrkala International Sculpture Park. Pirrkala, Finland
2003 – International Monumental Sculpture Symposium, Tultepec, Mexico
2002 – 1st. Annual Griffis Sculpture Park Symposium, East Otto, New York
2001 – International Monumental Sculpture Symposium, Tultepec, Mexico
2001 – 13th international Woodcarving Symposium, Kemijarvi, Finland
2000 – Ma'llot International Stone Carving Symposium, Ma'llot, Israel
2000 – Jish, Israel Stone Carving Symposium 2000, Jish Israel
2000 – International Monumental Sculpture Symposium, Tultepec, Mexico
2000 – International Monumental Sculpture Symposium, Granby, Canada
1999 – 4th Monumental International Stone Carving Symposium, Cayo Largo, Cuba
1999- 12th International Woodcarving Symposium, Kemijarvi, Finland
1999 – 7th International Trae Skulptur Symposium, Hojer, Denmark
1999 – 8th International Woodsculpting Symposium, Breckenridge, Colorado
1998 – Ecatepec International Monumental Sculpture Symposium, Ecatepec, Mexico
1998 – Large Outdoor Steel Sculpture, Association d’Eve’nements Internationauxde Sculpture
Monumentale, Granby, Quebec, Canada
1998 – 7th International Wood sculpting Symposium, Breckenridge, Colorado
1998 – 6th International Trae Skulptur Symposium, Hojer, Denmark
1998 – 3rd International Woodcarving Symposium & Competition, St. Blasien, Germany
1997 – 6th International Wood sculpting Symposium. Breckenridge, Colorado
1997- 11th International Woodcarving Symposium, Kemijarvi, Finland

Selected international exhibitions 
2007 – Toyamura International Sculpture Biennale, Hokkaido, Japan
2003 – Yuzi Paradise Sculpture Exhibition and Competition, China
2002 – Murray State University – Murray, Kentucky (January 27 – March 10)
2001 – Navy Pier – Maquette – 3D-Chicago, Chicago, Illinois
2001 – National Cheng Kung University Tainan, Taiwan
2001 – International Wood sculpting Exhibition, Kemijarvi, Finland
2001 – International Monumental Sculpture Exhibition, Mexico City, Mexico
2000 – The 7th International Shoebox Sculpture Exhibition, Honolulu, Hawaii
1999 – Sculpture for the Blind, "Licht Pause" Ehrenfelder Hochbunker, Cologne, Germany
1999 – "American Kaleidscope" Erkelenz, Germany
1999 – The 12th International Sculpture Exhibition, Kemijarvi, Finland
1998 – Small Bronze Sculpture Exhibition, Granby, Quebec, Canada
1997 – The 11th International Woodcarving Symposium and Exhibition, Kemijarvi, Finland

Selected solo exhibitions 
2006 -Solo Exhibition – Arts Council of Wayne County, Goldsboro, North Carolina
2006- Solo Exhibition – Imperial Center for the Arts and Sciences, Rocky Mount, North Carolina
2006 – Solo Exhibition- Spiers Gallery Brevard College, Brevard, North Carolina
2005 – Solo Exhibition – Ghost Fleet Gallery, Nags Head, North Carolina
2004 – Solo Exhibition – Greenville Technical College – Greer, South Carolina
2003 – Solo Exhibition – Fayetteville Museum of Art – Fayetteville, North Carolina
2003 – Solo Exhibition – Elon University, Elon, North Carolina
2003 – Solo Exhibition – Kinston Arts Council – Kinston, North Carolina
2003 – Solo Exhibition – UNC Raleigh – Raleigh, North Carolina
2002 – Solo Exhibition – Manteo Art Center – Manteo, North Carolina
2001 – Exhibition of New work, Concordia University, Milwaukee, Wisconsin
2001 – Exhibition of New work, Lee Hensley Gallery, Raleigh, North Carolina
2001 – Exhibition of New work, Simmons Gallery, Durham, North Carolina
2001 – Exhibition of New work, Illinois Central College, Peoria, Illinois
2000 – Exhibition of New work, the Rocky Mount Arts Center, Rocky Mount, North Carolina
2000 – Exhibition of Bronze Wall relief Sculptures, Duke University, Chapel Hill, North Carolina
1999 – Exhibition of New Work in Bronze and Soapstone, Sinclair Community College, Dayton, Ohio
1999 – Exhibition of New Work in bronze and soapstone, Mendenhall Student Center, Greenville, North Carolina
1999 – Exhibition of New Work in Soapstone and Bronze, Greenville Museum of Art, Greenville, North Carolina
1998 – Exhibition, New Works in Bronze, Art Elements Gallery, Mequon, Wisconsin
1998 – Exhibition of Bronze & Marble Sculpture, Berea College Art Dept., Berea, Kentucky
1998 – Exhibition of Bronze and Marble Sculpture, Greenville, Art Museum, Greenville, North Carolina
1997 – Exhibition of Bronze & Marble Sculpture, Ghost Fleet Gallery, Nags Head, North Carolina
1997 – Exhibition of Bronze Sculpture & Wall Relief, Goldsboro Arts Council, Goldsboro, North Carolina
1997 – Exhibition of Bronze Casting and Stone Carving, Kinston Art Center, Kinston, North Carolina

Selected national exhibitions 

2006 – The Fifth Annual Florida Outdoor Sculpture Competition, Polk Museum of Art, Lakeland, Florida
2005 – The Fourth Annual Florida Outdoor Sculpture Competition, Polk Museum of Art, Lakeland, Florida
2004 – Sculpture Vision 2004, Chappel Hill, North Carolina
2001 – 4th Annual Southern Conference Members Juried Exhibition, Columbia, South Carolina
2001 – Iron Tribe Exhibit, Highlands University, Las Vegas, New Mexico
1999 – "CCA 99' 18th Annual National Competition" Community Council for the Arts, Kinston, North Carolina
1999 – "The 14th Annual Indoor/Outdoor Sculpture Celebration" Lenoir, North Carolina
1998 – Works by Six North Carolina Sculptors, Wilson Arts Council Gallery, Wilson, North Carolina
1998 – The 41st. Annual Art Show, Rocky Mount Arts Center, Rocky Mount, North Carolina
1998 – The Third Annual “Artist’s Self Portrait” Exhibition & Competition, Ghost Fleet Gallery,
Nags Head, North Carolina
1996–97 Outdoor Sculpture Exhibition & Competition, Burlington County College, Pemberton, New Jersey
1996 – Second Mass Sculpture Exhibition & Competition, Center for Creative Art, Greensboro, North Carolina
1996 – 17th Annual National Juried Fine Arts Exhibition, Goldsboro, North Carolina
1996 – Spotlight 96' National American Craft Council, Louisville, Kentucky
1996 – 61st National Juried Exhibition, Cooperstown Art association, Cooperstown, New York
1996 – 1996 MONARCH National Ceramic Competition, Kennedy Douglas Center for the Arts, Florence, Alabama
1996 – CCA National Competition & Exhibition 96', Kinston Art Council Gallery, Kinston, North Carolina
1995 – Tri-State Art Exhibition, Gray gallery, East Carolina University, Greenville, North Carolina
1995 – The 18th Fine Arts Competition and Exhibition, University of Wisconsin, Milwaukee, Wisconsin
1995 – 16th National Juried Fine Arts Exhibition, Goldsboro, North Carolina

References

External links
Picture of work at Polk museum of Art
Picture of work at 19th Rosen Outdoor Sculpture Competition & Exhibition (2005–2006)
 International Sculpture Center

East Carolina University faculty
Living people
University of Wisconsin–Milwaukee alumni
Modern sculptors
Israeli Arab artists
Palestinian contemporary artists
Year of birth missing (living people)